In mathematics, more specifically algebraic topology, a pair  is shorthand for an inclusion of topological spaces . Sometimes  is assumed to be a cofibration.
 such that .

A pair of spaces is an ordered pair  where  is a topological space and  a subspace (with the subspace topology).

Heuristically, one often thinks of a pair  as being akin to the quotient space .

There is a functor from the category of topological spaces to the category of pairs of spaces, which sends a space  to the pair .

Triples are used in homotopy theory.

References

.

Algebraic topology